Apantesis virguncula, the little virgin tiger moth, is a moth of the  family Erebidae. It was described by W. Kirby in 1837. It is found across most of southern Canada and the United States, from the Rocky Mountains eastward. In the north, the range extends to northern Alberta and Newfoundland. In the south, it occurs along the Rocky Mountain to Apache County in Arizona and New Jersey in the east. It occurs in a variety of open wooded habitats, ranging from marshes, fens and bogs to transition parkland and prairie.

The length of the forewings is 13.9–20.5 mm. The forewings are black dorsally with yellowish buff to pale whitish buff lines and bands. The hindwings are yellow with black markings. Adults are generally on wing from mid June to late July, although there are records from late May to
late August.

The larvae feed on various herbaceous plants, particularly species of the family Asteraceae. Records include dandelion, knotweed and plantain.

This species was formerly a member of the genus Grammia, but was moved to Apantesis along with the other species of the genera Grammia, Holarctia, and Notarctia.

References

External links
 Natural History Museum Lepidoptera generic names catalog

Arctiina
Moths described in 1837